Robert Yarnall Richie (1908–1984) was an American photographer who worked as a freelance commercial and industrial photographer, in Texas and worldwide.  Richie's work is significant for its artistic qualities as well as documentary information. Richie may be best known for his oil production and aviation images in such areas as Texas, Louisiana, the Gulf of Mexico, and Saudi Arabia.

Richie had work published in the magazines Fortune, Time, Life, Scientific American, and National Geographic, and in other publications. He also contributed photos to annual reports for Fortune 500 companies such as General Motors, U.S. Steel, Gulf Oil, and Phelps Dodge.

Richie was an avid pilot, and his life work includes thousands of aerial photographs taken worldwide, as well as many photos of aircraft and other aviation-related subjects.

Many of his photos are collected in the Robert Yarnall Richie Photograph Collection, held by the DeGolyer Library at Southern Methodist University. The SMU archive contains corporate and industrial photographs made by Richie from 1932–1975. Many are online, and available at the SMU Central University Libraries Flickr site, at Flickr's The Commons area with no known copyright restrictions.

Photographs by Robert Yarnall Richie

References

External links

Robert Yarnall Richie Photographs at SMU's Flickr Commons site

1908 births
1984 deaths
20th-century American photographers
History of Texas
Industrial photographers
History of the petroleum industry
Aerial photographers